The 1993 French Grand Prix was a Formula One motor race held at Magny-Cours on 4 July 1993. It was the eighth race of the 1993 Formula One World Championship.

The 72-lap race was won by home favourite Alain Prost, driving a Williams-Renault, after he started from second position. Prost's British teammate Damon Hill finished second, having started from pole position and led the first 26 laps, with German Michael Schumacher third in a Benetton-Ford. With Prost's Brazilian rival Ayrton Senna finishing fourth in his McLaren-Ford, Prost extended his lead in the Drivers' Championship to 12 points.

The race marked Prost's 100th Formula One podium, making him the first driver to achieve the milestone. It was also the last Grand Prix for Fabrizio Barbazza.

Qualifying report
With local hero Alain Prost taking pole position in all of the previous seven races, there was a massive turnout for qualifying where the Williams were usually dominant. The Williams did take 1-2 in qualifying, but it was Damon Hill who took his first Formula One pole, 0.142 seconds ahead of Prost. The Ligier team, in its home race, filled the second row with Martin Brundle ahead of Mark Blundell, and thus completed a 1-2-3-4 for Renault-powered cars. Ayrton Senna in the McLaren and Jean Alesi in the Ferrari were on the third row, Michael Schumacher in the Benetton and Rubens Barrichello in the Jordan made up the fourth, and the Larrousse team, also contesting its home race, took up the fifth with Érik Comas ahead of Philippe Alliot. For the fourth time in five races, Michele Alboreto came last in his Lola and thus failed to qualify.

Qualifying classification

Race report
At the start, the top five stayed the same while Schumacher got ahead of Alesi. Hill led from Prost, Brundle, Blundell, Senna and Schumacher.

The Williams pulled away while Brundle pulled away from Blundell who was holding up Senna and Schumacher. However, this ended when Blundell was pushed off the road and into retirement on lap 21 as he attempted to lap de Cesaris. It was time for the mid-race stops during which Prost got ahead of Hill and Senna and Schumacher closed up on Brundle.

During the second stops, Prost stayed ahead - just by two-tenths while Senna and Schumacher got ahead of Brundle. Schumacher passed Senna when the two were going through traffic and pulled away. Prost won with Hill right behind to make it a Williams 1-2 ahead of Schumacher, Senna, Brundle and Andretti.

Thus, at the halfway stage of the season, Prost led the World Championship with 57 points. Senna was a further 12 points behind in second with 45, Hill was third with 28, Schumacher was fourth with 24, Brundle fifth with 9, Blundell sixth with 6, Herbert seventh with 6 and Lehto eighth with 5. There were no real battles in the Constructors Championship with Williams comfortably leading with 85 points with McLaren 37 points behind in second with 48. Benetton were third with 29 and Ligier were fourth with 15.

Following the death of former world champion James Hunt, former British driver Jonathan Palmer moved from pit lane reporter to take Hunt's place in the BBC commentary booth for the race. Palmer would continue to partner Murray Walker in the booth until the end of the  season.

By winning the race, Prost became the first Formula One driver to reach 100 career podiums.

Race classification

Championship standings after the race

Drivers' Championship standings

Constructors' Championship standings

References

French Grand Prix
Grand Prix
French Grand Prix
French Grand Prix